The Canaero Toucan is a Canadian high-wing, two seats in tandem, twin engine push-pull configuration, twin-boom ultralight kit aircraft that was produced from 1983 to the late 1980s by Canaero Dynamics Aircraft of Rexdale, Ontario.

The Toucan greatly resembles an ultralight Cessna Skymaster.

Design and development
The Toucan design work started in January 1983 and was completed in April of the same year, with the first flight of the prototype in September 1983. Construction of the first pre-production aircraft was started in July 1985 with the first production aircraft flying in January 1986.

Four prototypes/pre-production aircraft were completed, which were followed by a run of twelve Toucans, all completed by June 1986. A second batch of 25 aircraft were planned to have been completed by November 1986 as well.

The Toucan design features a strut-braced high wing built from aluminum covered with aircraft fabric. The wing's leading edge is of "D" cell construction and has fiberglass wing tips. Flight controls are conventional three-axis with full-span flaperons and  twin rudders. The fuselage is constructed from welded 4130 steel tube. When originally delivered an airframe parachute was standard.

The landing gear is of tricycle gear configuration with the main gear legs of sprung steel and brakes are standard equipment. Wheel pants, skis and pontoons were optional.

The original engines were  Rotax 277s with  Rotax 377 engines as optional, although some aircraft have been modified with larger engines.

Operational history

In Canada Toucans are registered as basic ultralights which prohibits passenger-carrying. Both seats can only be occupied by a student and instructor or two licensed pilots.

In November 2016 there were still five Toucans registered in Canada.

Aircraft on display
 Alberta Aviation Museum - in long term storage (2019)

Specifications (Toucan T-IV)

References

External links

Twin-boom aircraft
Twin-engined push-pull aircraft
Homebuilt aircraft
1980s Canadian ultralight aircraft
High-wing aircraft
Aircraft first flown in 1983